Petrick may refer to:

 Ben Petrick (born 1977), American baseball player
 Billy Petrick (born 1984), American baseball player
 Charlotte Petrick (born 1997), Canadian professional tennis player
 George Petrick (1917–1982), American politician
 Jose Petrick, Australian historian
 Joseph M. Petrick (born 1982), American writer and director
 Wolfgang Petrick (born 1939), German painter
 Zach Petrick (born 1989), American baseball pitcher

See also 
 Petrick's method, a calculation method in boolean algebra by Stanley R. Petrick